The Triglav Trophy is an annual international figure skating competition held in the spring in Jesenice, Slovenia. The competition takes its name from the nearby mountain Triglav, the highest peak in Slovenia.

The Triglav Trophy is usually the last ISU-sanctioned international competition of the season. Medals may be awarded in men's and ladies' singles on the novice, junior, and senior levels. A pairs category has been included a few times.

Senior medalists

Men

Ladies

Junior medalists

Men

Ladies

Pairs

Advanced novice medalists

Men

Ladies

Pairs

References

External links
 
 Skate Canada Results Book